Gregory De Wayne "Boomer" Wells (born April 25, 1954) is an American former professional baseball player.

He played 47 career Major League games in two seasons, batting .228, with 28 hits in 127 at-bats.

In more than ten NPB seasons he compiled a .317 batting average and a .555 slugging percentage, with 277 home runs and 901 RBI. In 1984, while playing for the Hankyu Braves, Wells won the NPB Triple Crown, with a batting average of .355, 37 home runs, and 130 runs batted in, also winning the Most Valuable Player award in the process. He was the first non-Japanese winner of the Triple Crown.

However, he requested a trade to the Fukuoka Daiei Hawks in 1992 because when Orix rebranded the team as the BlueWave, he hated the new name, new colors, and the new stadium. He hated it so much that it had been said that Wells conspired with some clubbies to take the field in an Orix Braves jersey, however, no media of him doing that has yet to surface to prove he actually did it. When he was traded to the Hawks, he told the media in Kansai that he still loved Braves fans who followed him in Nishinomiya, and the fact that he requested the trade was the fault of Shozo Doi and Orix.

References

External links
, or Retrosheet

1954 births
Living people
African-American baseball players
Albany State Golden Rams baseball players
American expatriate baseball players in Canada
American expatriate baseball players in Japan
Baseball players from Alabama
Beeville Bees players
Cardenales de Lara players
American expatriate baseball players in Venezuela
Dunedin Blue Jays players
Fukuoka Daiei Hawks players
Hankyu Braves players
Kinston Eagles players
Major League Baseball first basemen
Minnesota Twins players
Nippon Professional Baseball MVP Award winners
Orix BlueWave players
Orix Braves players
People from Washington County, Alabama
Syracuse Chiefs players
Tigres de Aragua players
Toledo Mud Hens players
Toronto Blue Jays players
Utica Blue Jays players
21st-century African-American people
20th-century African-American sportspeople